Yttrogummite is an yttrium-bearing variety of gummite mineral. It is a rare earth mineral containing relatively large amounts of the yttrium earths. It is an alteration product of yttrian uraninite.

It was first described by Adolf Erik Nordenskiöld, who discovered it in Arendal, Norway in 1870s.

References

Uranium minerals
Yttrium minerals